Daniel 'Dani' Borreguero Reina (born 16 November 1975) is a Spanish retired footballer who played as a midfielder.

During a 15-year professional career he amassed Segunda División totals of 307 matches and 18 goals over nine seasons, representing in the competition Elche, Sporting de Gijón, Hércules and Ponferradina.

Club career
Born in Barcelona, Catalonia, Borreguero started his professional career with local CE L'Hospitalet. In 1997 he signed with second division side Elche CF, going on to spend the next 12 years in that level, also representing Sporting de Gijón, Hércules CF and SD Ponferradina and being relegated with the latter team in the 2006–07 season.

In 2009–10, Borreguero contributed with 13 games as Ponferradina returned to the second tier after a three-year absence, as group champions. Midway through the campaign, aged nearly 35, he moved to amateurs CA Bembibre, leaving the club and retiring after only a couple of months.

On 8 July 2015, at almost 40, Borreguero returned to active and signed for amateur side CD Colunga. One year later, he joined UD Gijón Industrial.

References

External links

1975 births
Living people
Footballers from Barcelona
Spanish footballers
Association football midfielders
Segunda División players
Segunda División B players
Tercera División players
CE L'Hospitalet players
Elche CF players
Sporting de Gijón players
Hércules CF players
SD Ponferradina players